Deh Shahverdi-ye Sofla (also Romanized as Deh Shāhverdī-ye Soflá) is a village in Hoseynabad-e Goruh Rural District, Rayen District, Kerman County, Kerman Province, Iran. At the 2006 census, its population was 23, in 10 families.

References 

Populated places in Kerman County